Phragmataecia itremo is a species of moth of the family Cossidae. It is found on Madagascar.

References

Moths described in 1974
Phragmataecia
Moths of Madagascar
Moths of Africa